The Chamalals are an indigenous people of Dagestan, North Caucasia living in a few villages in the Tsumadinsky District on the left bank of the Andi-Koisu river. They have their own language, Chamalal, and primarily follow Sunni Islam, which reached the Chamalal people around the 8th or 9th century. There are about 5,000 ethnic Chamalals (1999, Kubrik). They are culturally similar to the Avars.

Neighboring peoples are the Godoberi, Avars, Bagvalals, and Tindis.

References

The peoples of the Red Book: Chamalals

Ethnic groups in Dagestan
Muslim communities of Russia
Peoples of the Caucasus
Muslim communities of the Caucasus